The list of wealthiest animals in the world include animals that have inherited or earned over 1 million U.S. dollars.

Through inheritance
Animals are not legal persons and cannot directly own property. Animals typically "inherit" money through a pet trust through which the money must be used for their care after the death of the owner.

 Gigoo was a Scots Dumpy hen willed $15 million. She was owned by Miles Blackwell, a publisher of textbooks.
 Tommaso is a black cat who lives in Italy and inherited $13 million. The cat was a stray that found its way into the home of Maria Assunta, a property magnate in Italy. When Assunta died at the age of 94, she willed her fortune to either the cat or an animal welfare charity that would look after it. It was decided after no suitable charity could be found that the money would be given to the cat, held in trust by Assunta's nurse.
 Blackie, considered the richest cat by Guinness World Records until 2018, inherited a $12.5 million fortune.
 Conchita, a Chihuahua, was bequeathed $3 million plus an $8.3 million mansion in Miami by heiress Gail Posner.
 Trouble is a dog that was owned by Leona Helmsley, to which she bequeathed $12 million in a will that disinherited her two grandchildren. A judge later amended the amount down to $2M.
 Flossie, a dog owned by Drew Barrymore, barked to alert her and then-husband Tom Green of a fire. She put her $1.3M house in trust for the dog to show her gratitude.
 Tinker was a stray cat that was bequeathed an $800,000 home and a $226,000 trust fund.
 Choupette was the cat companion of fashion magnate Karl Lagerfeld, and it is rumored that she was left at least part of Lagerfeld's US$200 million fortune after his death in 2019.
 Lulu, an 8-year-old Border Collie, inherited $5M in her owner's last will.

Through earnings 
Some animals become "wealthy" as the result of entertainment, such as through acting on film or television, for advertising and marketing campaigns or as an Internet meme.

 Tardar Sauce, better known as Grumpy Cat, had an estimated worth of at least $1 million.
 Olivia Benson (Taylor Swift's cat) has an estimated worth of at least $97 million.

Hoaxes 
 Reportedly, Toby Rimes, a poodle, inherited $20 million from New Yorker Ella Wendel in 1931. In fact it seems that no such bequest was made.
 In 2021, the Associated Press and several other news organizations reported that a German Shepherd dog named Gunther VI inherited $400 million dollars from Countess Karlotta Leibenstein of Germany. The day after the Associated Press article, the New York Post published an article disputing the validity of the claim. The Associated Press later removed the article from its website and published a new article admitting the story was a fabrication.

See also
 List of individual cats
 List of individual dogs
 List of individual apes
 List of wealthiest families
 List of wealthiest historical figures
 The World's Billionaires
 List of wealthiest religious organizations

References

Distribution of wealth
Wealthiest